Krückau is a river in the federal state of Schleswig-Holstein in the north of Germany. It flows into the river Elbe near Seestermühe. The  lower part between the Elbe and Elmshorn is navigable but not classified.

See also
List of rivers of Schleswig-Holstein

References

Rivers of Schleswig-Holstein
Federal waterways in Germany
Rivers of Germany